"Burnin" is an instrumental track from French electronic music duo Daft Punk's debut album, Homework (1997). It was the fourth single released from the album. The accompanying music video for the track was directed by French photographer and video director Seb Janiak. The song later had a remix entitled "Extravaganza", created by Korean band BanYa for the dance video game Pump It Up. Elements of "Burnin'" were combined with the song "Too Long" in Daft Punk's live album Alive 2007.

Critical reception
British magazine Music Week rated the song three out of five, adding, "A more minimal, scratchy groove than Da Funk or Around The World, the duo's third single for Virgin is nevertheless funky, and the Towering Inferno-style video should help exposure."

Music video
The music video for "Burnin'" pays tribute to Chicago house producers that Daft Punk found inspiration in. The party scene in the video features DJ Sneak, Roger Sanchez, Derrick Carter, Roy Davis Jr., Paul Johnson, Robert Armani and DJ Hyperactive. Thomas Bangalter and Guy-Manuel de Homem-Christo of Daft Punk also make brief cameo appearances in the video as people at the party; Bangalter wears sunglasses and a long-haired, dark wig, while de Homem-Chisto appears in a purple suit, sunglasses and blonde wig. The video was shot in Chicago using an office building at One South Wacker Drive as the setting.

The video begins with a boy playing with a toy fire truck in a suburb while his father cooks steak on a barbecue. The scene oscillates from this setting to a party scene within a skyscraper, in which a fire spreads while nobody at the party seems to notice. A team of firefighters eventually alert the party attendants of the fire and escort them from the building. It is suggested that the boy and his fire truck are somehow connected to the firefighter rescue and evacuation in the video.

Track listing
12" maxi (Virgin VISA 8197)

CD maxi (Virgin 7243 8 94551 2 0)

Charts

References

External links

1997 singles
Daft Punk songs
Songs written by Guy-Manuel de Homem-Christo
Songs written by Thomas Bangalter
1997 songs
Virgin Records singles